Edward Close may refer to:

 Edward Charles Close (1790–1866), British soldier, engineer and member of the New South Wales Legislative Council
 Edward Close Jr. (1825–1887), pastoralist and member of the New South Wales Legislative Assembly, son of Edward Charles Close.